Caffrocrambus machiavellii is a moth in the family Crambidae. It was described by Graziano Bassi in 2002. It is found in South Africa, where it has been recorded from the Western Cape.

References

Crambinae
Moths described in 2002
Moths of Africa